Drew Plitt (born January 9, 1998) is an American football quarterback for the Arlington Renegades of the XFL. He played college football at Ball State.

Early life and high school
Plitt grew up in Loveland, Ohio and attended Loveland High School, where he played basketball and football.  As a junior, he passed for 1,346 yards and 13 touchdowns. Plitt committed to play college football at Ball State over offers from Eastern Michigan, Bowling Green, and Lafayette.

College career
Plitt redshirted his true freshman season at Ball State. He mostly served as the Cardinals' backup during the following two seasons. Plitt passed for 2,918 yards and 24 touchdowns with seven interceptions as a redshirt junior. He completed 65.6% of his pass attempts for 2,164 yards and 17 touchdowns to six interceptions in eight games during the team's COVID-19-shortened 2020 season and was named second-team All-Mid-American Conference (MAC). Plitt was named the Offensive MVP of the 2020 MAC Championship Game after completing 20 of 32 pass attempts for 263 yards and three touchdowns and also rushing for a touchdown in the Cardinals' 38–28 win over Buffalo. He was also named the MVP of the 2020 Arizona Bowl as Ball State beat 22nd-ranked San Jose State 34–13 in the first bowl game win in program history.

Plitt decided to utilize the extra year of eligibility granted to college athletes who played in the 2020 season due to the coronavirus pandemic and return to Ball State for a sixth season. In his final season, he passed for 2,541 yards and 18 touchdowns while also rushing for 131 yards and two touchdowns.

Professional career

Cincinnati Bengals
Plitt went unselected in the 2022 NFL Draft and participated in minicamps as a tryout player for several teams, including for the Cincinnati Bengals in May 2022. The Bengals eventually signed him as an undrafted free agent on July 27. In the team's preseason opener against the Arizona Cardinals, Plitt completed all six of his pass attempts for 76 yards and one touchdown to register a perfect passer rating of 158.3. Plitt was waived by the Bengals on August 23, 2022.

Arlington Renegades
On September 29, 2022, XFL Reporter Mike Mitchell reported that 8 quarterbacks that worked with Jordan Palmer have reportedly signed with each team. Plitt was signed to the Arlington Renegades.

Professional statistics

References

External links
Ball State Cardinals bio
Cincinnati Bengals bio

1998 births
Living people
Players of American football from Ohio
American football quarterbacks
Arlington Renegades players
Ball State Cardinals football players
Cincinnati Bengals players
People from Loveland, Ohio
Sportspeople from the Cincinnati metropolitan area